Eucephalus tomentellus is a North American species of flowering plant in the family Asteraceae known by the common name Brickellbush aster or rayless aster. It grows on openings in oak or conifer forests the Siskiyou Mountains of the US States of California and Oregon.

Eucephalus tomentellus is a perennial herb up to 90 cm (3 feet) tall, with a woody caudex. Stems are covered with woolly or cottony hair. Leaves are whitish and waxy. One plant will usually produce 3-40 flower heads in a large array. Each head has 0-6 purple-violet  ray florets surrounding numerous yellow  disc florets.

References

Astereae
Flora of Oregon
Flora of California
Plants described in 1889
Flora without expected TNC conservation status